The Hebrew Goddess is a 1967 book by Jewish historian and anthropologist Raphael Patai, in which the author argues that historically, the Jewish religion had elements of polytheism, especially the worship of goddesses and a cult of the mother goddess.

Earlier themes
Raphael Patai's first exploration of this theme was in his 1947 book, Man and Temple in Ancient Jewish Myth and Ritual (New York: Nelson), where he cites textual evidence that was not repeated in his later works.

Thesis
The Hebrew Goddess supports the theory through the interpretation of archaeological and textual sources as evidence for veneration of feminine beings. Hebrew goddesses identified in the book include Asherah, Anath, Astarte, Ashima, the cherubim in Solomon's Temple, the Matronit (Shekhina), and the personified "Shabbat Bride".

The later editions of the book were expanded to include recent archaeological discoveries and the rituals of unification (Yichudim), which are to unite God with his Shekinah.

The identification of the pillar figurines with Asherah in this book was the first time they had been identified as such.

Further publications
A third, enlarged edition, was published in 1990 by Wayne State University Press.

References

Bibliography
 

1967 non-fiction books
1990 non-fiction books
History books about Judaism
Religion in ancient Israel and Judah
Judaism and women
Matriarchy
Feminist theology
Judaism and paganism
Astarte
Asherah
Anat